The 1981 Seiko Hong Kong Classic, also known as the Hong Kong Open, was a men's tennis tournament played on outdoor hard courts in Hong Kong that was part of the 1981 Grand Prix tennis circuit. It was the ninth edition of the event and was held from 2 November through 8 November 1981. Unseeded Van Winitsky won the singles title.

Finals

Singles
 Van Winitsky defeated  Mark Edmondson 6–4, 6–7, 6–4
 It was Winitsky's first singles title of his career.

Doubles
 Chris Mayotte /  Chris Dunk defeated  Marty Davis /  Brad Drewett 6–4, 7–6

References

External links
 ITF tournament edition details

Viceroy Classic
1981 in Hong Kong
Tennis in Hong Kong